San Vincenzo La Costa is a town and comune in the province of Cosenza in the Calabria region of southern Italy.

Geography
San Vincenzo La Costa is a small town made up of villages including San Vincenzo, Gesuiti, Giuranda, Greco, Pallazello. The town is bordered by Montalto Uffugo, Rende and San Fili. It is largely composed of residents who rely on farming existence and finding employment towards larger cities such as nearby Cosenza.

References 

Cities and towns in Calabria